Jessie Iris Martin  (19 December 1898 – 19 July 1982) was a New Zealand nurse, hospital matron, tutor and nurses' association leader. She was born in Wellington, New Zealand, on 19 December 1898. Her father was Lee Martin.

In the 1955 Queen's Birthday Honours, Martin was appointed a Member of the Order of the British Empire, for services to nursing, and especially as matron of Cook Hospital in Gisborne.

She sought the Labour Party nomination for the 1959 Hamilton by-election, but was unsuccessful.

References

1898 births
1982 deaths
New Zealand nurses
People from Wellington City
New Zealand women nurses
New Zealand Members of the Order of the British Empire
New Zealand Labour Party politicians
Women trade union leaders
New Zealand trade unionists